D. Graham Burnett is an American historian of science and a writer. He is a professor at Princeton University and an editor at Cabinet, based in Brooklyn, New York. Burnett received his A.B. in history (concentration in the history of science) at Princeton University and an M.Phil and Ph.D. in the history and philosophy of science at Trinity College, Cambridge.

Awards and recognition

 2013-2014 Guggenheim Fellow
 Andrew W. Mellon Foundation “New Directions” Fellowship, 2009-2011
 Hermalyn Prize in Urban History, Bronx Historical Society, 2008 
 New York City Book Award, New York Society Library, 2007
 Howard Foundation Fellowship in the History of Science, 2005-2006
 Christian Gauss Fund University Preceptorship, Princeton University, 2004-2007 
 National Endowment for the Humanities Fellowship, 2003-2004 
 Cullman Fellow, New York Public Library, Center for Scholars and Writers, 1999-2000
 Nebenzahl Prize in the History of Cartography, Newberry Library, Chicago, 1999 
 U.S. Marshall Scholarship, 1993-1995 
 Moses Taylor Pyne Prize, highest undergraduate award at Princeton University, 1993
 Salutatorian, Princeton University Class of 1993, gave Latin address at Commencement, 1993

Works 
 The Sounding of the Whale: Science and Cetaceans in the Twentieth Century University of Chicago Press. January 2012, paperback edition 2013. 
 Trying Leviathan: The Nineteenth-Century New York Court Case That Put the Whale on Trial and Challenged the Order of Nature Princeton University Press. November 2007; paperback edition, 2008.
 A Trial By Jury Knopf. September 2001; Japanese edition, 2006.
 Descartes and the Hyperbolic Quest: Lens-Making in the Seventeenth Century American Philosophical Society, Transactions series.  Vol. 95 (3): 2005.
 Masters of All They Surveyed: Exploration, Geography, and a British El Dorado University of Chicago Press. September 2000. 
 A Little Common Place Book, introduction by D. Graham Burnett (New York: Cabinet Books, and Proteotypes, 2010).

References

External links 
 Interview in The Boston Globe
 D. Graham Burnett
 An index of Cabinet magazine contributions
 Lecture on natural history and systematics, Smithsonian Institution. 2008.
Interview on the history of science published in Temporalidades

Year of birth missing (living people)
Living people
21st-century American historians
21st-century American male writers
Historians of science
Marshall Scholars
Princeton University alumni
Alumni of Trinity College, Cambridge
American science writers
American male non-fiction writers